Granville Barrere (July 11, 1829 – January 13, 1889) was a U.S. Representative from Illinois, nephew of Nelson Barrere.

Born in New Market, near Hillsboro, Ohio, Barrere attended the common schools and Augusta College, Augusta, Kentucky, and graduated from Marietta College, Marietta, Ohio.
He studied law.
He was admitted to the bar in Chillicothe, Ohio, in 1853 and commenced practice in Marion, Arkansas.
He moved to Bloomington, Illinois, in 1855, and then to Canton, Illinois, the same year, and continued the practice of his profession.
He served as member of the city board of education.
He served as member of the board of supervisors of Canton.

Barrere was elected as a Republican to the Forty-third Congress (March 4, 1873–March 3, 1875).
He was an unsuccessful candidate for renomination in 1874.
He resumed the practice of law.
He died in Canton, Illinois, January 13, 1889.
He was interred in Greenwood Cemetery in Canton.

References

1829 births
1889 deaths
Arkansas lawyers
Illinois lawyers
Ohio lawyers
Illinois city council members
School board members in Illinois
People from Canton, Illinois
People from Highland County, Ohio
Ohio Republicans
Republican Party members of the United States House of Representatives from Illinois
People from Augusta, Kentucky
19th-century American politicians
19th-century American lawyers